Hadranax augustus is a species of xenusiid lobopodian known from the lower Cambrian Sirius Passet Lagerstätte.

References

Prehistoric protostome genera
Lobopodia